"Love Remains" is a song written by Tom Douglas and Jim Daddario, and recorded by American country music artist Collin Raye.  It was released in June 1996 as the fourth single from his album I Think About You.  The song reached number 12 on the Billboard Hot Country Singles & Tracks chart in November 1996.

The song features several layered background vocals from bass guitarist Joe Chemay.

The song was later covered by country music artist Hillary Scott, of the group Lady Antebellum, along with her family and appeared on Scott's 2016 Christian/Gospel album of the same title.

Chart performance

Year-end charts

Hillary Scott & the Scott Family version

References

1996 singles
1995 songs
Collin Raye songs
Epic Records singles
Songs written by Tom Douglas (songwriter)
Song recordings produced by Paul Worley